Newberg is a surname. Notable people with the surname include:

Andrew B. Newberg, neurotheologist
Esther Newberg, literary agent
Heidi Jo Newberg, astrophysicist
Herbert B. Newberg, class action lawyer
J. Chris Newberg, comedian at Mark Ridley's Comedy Castle
Jamey Newberg, baseball commentator
Randy Newberg, a host of On Your Own Adventures